The Quaid-e-Azam Stadium (also known as Mirpur Cricket Stadium) is a cricket stadium in sector F/2 Mirpur, Azad Kashmir, Pakistan. It is the home of Azad Jammu & Kashmir cricket team. The stadium has a seating capacity of 16,000, making it the largest stadium in Azad Kashmir.

On 11 July 2008, the Azad Jammu & Kashmir government handed over the Quaid-e-Azam Cricket Stadium to Pakistan Cricket Board (PCB) for holding national and international cricket matches. The PCB announced it will be installing an electrical scoreboard, floodlights and all other required facilities for holding international and national one-day matches.

Matches hosted 
The Mirpur Stadium has hosted twenty first-class matches. It hosted six matches of the 2012–13 Faysal Bank One Day Cup. it has also hosted three Under-19 international matches against Australia in 2007. In this stadium on inauguration of stadium a match was held on which Makhdoom Abbas Played Extraordinary 50+Runs. Due to an earthquake in September 2019, forcing the It was due to host two Quaid-e-Azam Trophy Second XI matches in October 2019, but they were shifted to Karachi after an earthquake damaged the dressing room and the team hotel.

See also
 Narol Cricket Stadium (Muzaffarabad Cricket Stadium)
 Sardar Muhammad Hussain Sport's Complex, Bagh,  Azad Kashmir
 List of stadiums in Pakistan
 List of cricket grounds in Pakistan
 Kashmir Premier League (Pakistan)
 Kashmir Premier League (India)

References

External links
PCB Profile 
Cricinfo Profile
CricketArchive Profile

Cricket grounds in Pakistan
Buildings and structures in Azad Kashmir
Sport in Azad Kashmir
Memorials to Muhammad Ali Jinnah